WireShare (formerly known as LimeWire Pirate Edition) is a revival of the LimeWire software (a gnutella p2p-network client). The original LimeWire Pirate Edition was adapted from LimeWire Basic edition to provide similar features to LimeWire Pro, with no adware, advertising, or backdoor control. The Ask toolbar integration was removed, along with dependencies on LimeWire servers and remote settings. The software supports Windows, Linux and Mac, and its source code is available on GitHub.

History
After LimeWire was shut down by the RIAA, a hacker with the alias of "Meta Pirate" created LimeWire Pirate Edition. Lime Wire LLC, has stated that the company were "not behind these efforts. LimeWire does not authorize them. LimeWire is complying with the Court’s October 26, 2010 injunction." The LimeWire team acted to shut down the Pirate Edition website. A court order was issued to close down the website. Meta Pirate did not contest the order.

After it was shut down, the original LimeWire open source project was reforked into WireShare with the goal of preserving the Gnutella network and maintaining a sincere continuation of the original effort; the software still continues today.

See also

 FrostWire, a former gnutella client, and also a LimeWire fork, that was created in 2004, also with the purpose of removing adware and backdoors.

References

External links
 
 LimeWire Pirate Edition source code at GitHub
 Guide to using LimeWire
 LimeWire Pirate Editions by MetaPirate and File_Girl71

Gnutella clients
Free BitTorrent clients
Free file sharing software
Free software programmed in Java (programming language)
Internet services shut down by a legal challenge